Up on High is the seventh studio album by American band Vetiver. It was released on November 1, 2019 under Mama Bird Records. In support for the album, a tour of the U.S. and the U.K. was announced.

The first single from the album, "To Who Knows Where" was released on August 28, 2019.

Critical reception
Up on High was met with generally favorable reviews from critics. At Metacritic, which assigns a weighted average rating out of 100 to reviews from mainstream publications, this release received an average score of 76, based on 11 reviews.

Track listing

References

2019 albums
Vetiver albums